Punctabyssia is a genus of small sea snails, marine gastropod mollusks in the family Pseudococculinidae, the false limpets.

Species
Species within the genus Punctabyssia include:
 Punctabyssia tibbetsi McLean, 1991

References

External links
 To World Register of Marine Species

Pseudococculinidae
Monotypic gastropod genera